The Adventures of a Jungle Boy is a 1957 British syndicated adventure series.  The show was known for its striking similarity to the Tarzan movie series.

Plot
A young boy is the sole survivor of a plane crash in the African jungle.  He is found and raised, along with his pet cheetah, by Dr. Laurence, a research scientist.  The series portrays their efforts to protect the jungle from outside threats and to save the jungle inhabitants from danger.

Cast and characters
Michael Carr Hartley as Boy
Ronald Adam as Dr. Laurence

British actors guest starring in the series included Peter Dyneley, Patrick Holt, Conrad Phillips, David Oxley, Leonard Sachs, Robert Arden, Patricia Plunkett and Andrew Faulds.

Carr Hartley was the son of an animal-handler and performed all of the animal stunts himself.  He later was part of "Carr-Hartley Safaris," a family business in Kenya.

Episodes
"Meet Jungle Boy"
"Adoption Story"
"The Doctor Man"
"A Child By the River"
"Boy and the Reverend"
"The Journey Up River"
"Young Love"
"Doctor's Dilemma"
"Jungle Boy and the Diamonds"
"The Burial Ground"
"The Ways of a Witch Doctor"
"Kidnapped"
"Runaway Boy"

References

External links

Memorable TV:  Adventures of a Jungle Boy

1950s British drama television series
1957 British television series debuts
1957 British television series endings
Black-and-white British television shows
First-run syndicated television programs in the United States
British adventure television series